CRT or Crt may refer to:

Science, technology, and mathematics

Medicine and biology
 Calreticulin, a protein 
Capillary refill time, for blood to refill capillaries 
Cardiac resynchronization therapy and CRT defibrillator (CRT-D) 
Catheter-related thrombosis,  the development of a blood clot related to long-term use of central venous catheters
Certified Respiratory Therapist 
Chemoradiotherapy, chemo- and radiotherapy combined
 Cognitive Retention Therapy, for dementia
 Corneal Refractive Therapy, in optometrics
 CRT (genetics), a gene cluster

Mathematics and technology
 Cathode-ray tube, a display
 Chinese remainder theorem in number theory
 Microsoft C Run-Time library
 SecureCRT, formerly CRT, a telnet client
 .crt, X.509 Certificate filename extension

Social sciences

 Cognitive reflection test, in psychology
 Critical race theory, an academic framework of analysis
 Current reality tree (theory of constraints), in process management

Transport
 Canal & River Trust, England and Wales
 Changchun Rail Transit, China
 Chongqing Rail Transit, China
 Connecticut River Transit, former bus service in Vermont, US
 Former Cross River Tram project, London
 CRT Group, transport company in Australia
 Chicago Rapid Transit Company, former rail company

Other uses
 Canadian Railway Troops, WWI
 Charitable remainder trust
 Civil Resolution Tribunal
 Claiming Rule Teams, in motorcycle racing
 Columbia River Treaty, Canada-US, 1960s
 Connecticut Repertory Theatre, University of Connecticut
 Correctional Emergency Response Team
 An abbreviation for Crater (constellation)
 Iyojwaʼja Chorote, a language in Salta province, Argentina, ISO 639 code